Colobothea lunulata is a species of beetle in the family Cerambycidae. It was described by Hippolyte Lucas in 1859. It is known from Bolivia, Brazil, Ecuador and Peru.

References

lunulata
Beetles described in 1859